The UK Albums Chart is one of many music charts compiled by the Official Charts Company that calculates the best-selling albums of the week in the United Kingdom. Since 2004 the chart has been based on the sales of both physical albums and digital downloads. This list shows albums that peaked in the Top 10 of the UK Albums Chart during 2004, as well as albums which peaked in 2003 and 2005 but were in the top 10 in 2004. The entry date is when the album appeared in the top 10 for the first time (week ending, as published by the Official Charts Company, which is six days after the chart is announced).

One-hundred and thirty-four albums were in the top ten this year. Thirteen albums from 2003 remained in the top 10 for several weeks at the beginning of the year, while Hot Fuss by The Killers and Love Songs: A Compilation… Old and New by Phil Collins were both released in 2004 but did not reach their peak until 2005. Elephunk by The Black Eyed Peas and Twentysomething by Jamie Cullum were the albums from 2003 to reach their peak in 2004. Eight artists scored multiple entries in the top 10 in 2004. Dizzee Rascal, Franz Ferdinand, The Killers, McFly and Scissor Sisters were among the many artists who achieved their first UK charting top 10 album in 2004.

The 2003 Christmas number-one album, Life for Rent by Dido, remained at the top spot for the first week of 2004. Friday's Child by Will Young returned for a second week as a chart topper after scaling the chart in December 2003, with Life for Rent subsequently replacing Friday's Child for another two weeks on top. The first new number-one album of the year was Call Off the Search by Katie Melua. Overall, twenty-nine different albums peaked at number-one in 2004, with twenty-nine unique artists hitting that position.

Background

Multiple entries
One-hundred and thirty-four albums charted in the top 10 in 2004, with one-hundred and twenty-two albums reaching their peak this year (including Gold: Greatest Hits, Greatest, No Angel, Original Pirate Material, The Stone Roses and Tears Roll Down (Greatest Hits 82–92), which all charted in previous years but reached a peak on their latest chart run).

Eight artists scored multiple entries in the top 10 in 2004. Daniel O'Donnell, Dido, Joss Stone, Phil Collins, R.E.M., Red Hot Chili Peppers, The Streets and Westlife were the acts who had two top 10 albums this year. Daniel O'Donnell, Joss Stone and Phil Collin's two entries were both released this year, with Original Pirate Material by The Streets returning after missing the top 10 when it was first released in 2002.

Chart debuts
Thirty-three artists achieved their first top 10 album in 2004 as a lead artist. Joss Stone and The Streets both had one more entry in their breakthrough year.

The following table (collapsed on desktop site) does not include acts who had previously charted as part of a group and secured their first top 10 solo album, or featured appearances on compilations or other artists recordings. 
 

Notes
Brian Wilson Presents Smile was the first album released by The Beach Boys founder Brian Wilson to make the top ten in his solo career. With his group, he had contributed to fourteen UK top 10 studio and compilation albums.

Best-selling albums
Scissor Sisters had the best-selling album of the year with Scissor Sisters. The album spent 41 weeks in the top 10 (including four weeks at number one), sold over 1.594 million copies and was certified 5× platinum by the BPI. Hopes and Fears by Keane came in second place. Robbie Williams' Greatest Hits, Songs About Jane from Maroon 5 and Call Off the Search by Katie Melua made up the top five. Albums by Anastacia, Usher, Norah Jones, Snow Patrol and Il Divo were also in the top ten best-selling albums of the year.

Top-ten albums
Key

Entries by artist
The following table shows artists who achieved two or more top 10 entries in 2004, including albums that reached their peak in 2003 or 2005. The figures only include main artists, with featured artists and appearances on compilation albums not counted individually for each artist. The total number of weeks an artist spent in the top ten in 2003 is also shown.

Notes

 Hot Fuss reached its peak of number-one on 22 January 2005 (week ending).
 Stripped re-entered the top 10 at number 9 on 10 January 2004 (week ending).
 Fallen re-entered the top 10 at number 7 on 10 January 2004 (week ending) for 5 weeks.
 Permission to Land re-entered the top 10 at number 5 on 28 February 2004 (week ending) for 2 weeks.
 Elephunk re-entered the top 10 at number 9 on 17 July 2004 (week ending).
 Three re-entered the top 10 at number 10 on 17 January 2004 (week ending).
 Twentysomething re-entered the top 10 at number 3 on 6 March 2004 (week ending) for 4 weeks.
 Greatest Hits (Red Hot Chili Peppers album) re-entered the top 10 at number 10 on 31 January 2004 (week ending).
 Friday's Child re-entered the top 10 at number 10 on 13 March 2004 (week ending) for 6 weeks and at number 7 on 24 July 2004 (week ending).
 No Angel originally peaked at number-one upon its initial release in 2001.
 Tears Roll Down (Greatest Hits 82–92) originally peaked at number 2 upon its initial release in 1992. It re-entered the top 10 at number 9 on 21 February 2004 (week ending).
 Speakerboxxx/The Love Below re-entered the top 10 at number 8 on 6 March 2004 (week ending) for 2 weeks, at number 10 on 17 July 2004 (week ending) for 3 weeks and at number 8 on 8 January 2005 (week ending).
 The Singles 1992–2003 re-entered the top 10 at number 5 on 6 March 2004 (week ending) for 2 weeks. 
 The Soul Sessions re-entered the top 10 at number 7 on 22 May 2004 (week ending) for 10 weeks.
 Final Straw re-entered the top 10 at number 7 on 1 May 2004 (week ending) for 3 weeks and at number 6 on 24 July 2004 (week ending) for 8 weeks.
 Franz Ferdinand re-entered the top 10 at number 10 on 8 May 2004 (week ending) for 3 weeks, at number 10 on 18 September 2004 (week ending), at number 10 on 8 January 2005 (week ending) for 4 weeks and at number 4 on 19 February 2005 (week ending) for 3 weeks.
 Greatest originally peaked at number outside the top ten at number 15 upon its initial release in 1998.
 Greatest Hits (Guns N' Roses album) re-entered the top 10 at number 10 on 26 June 2004 (week ending).
 Ultimate Manilow re-entered the top 10 at number 9 on 16 October 2004 (week ending).
 Confessions re-entered the top 10 at number 8 on 5 June 2004 (week ending) for 14 weeks and at number 10 on 16 October 2004 (week ending).
 Anastacia re-entered the top 10 at number 7 on 7 August 2004 (week ending) for 7 weeks.
 Scissor Sisters re-entered the top 10 at number 5 on 26 June 2004 (week ending) for 12 weeks, at number 10 on 23 October 2004 (week ending) for 5 weeks and at number 7 on 25 December 2004 (week ending) for 14 weeks.
 Gold: Greatest Hits originally peaked at number-one upon its initial release in 1992. It returned to its peak again after being re-released in 1999.
 Songs About Jane re-entered the top 10 at number 10 on 12 June 2004 (week ending), at number 7 on 10 August 2004 (week ending) for 14 weeks and at number 9 on 11 December 2004 (week ending) for 9 weeks.
 Hopes and Fears re-entered the top 10 at number 9 on 27 November 2004 (week ending) for 2 weeks, at number 10 on 18 December 2004 (week ending) for 3 weeks, at number 6 on 15 January 2005 (week ending) for 10 weeks, at number 5 on 16 July 2005 (week ending) and at number 9 on 30 July 2005 (week ending) for 2 weeks.
 Hurt No More re-entered the top 10 at number 8 on 3 July 2004 (week ending).
 Under My Skin re-entered the top 10 at number 9 on 31 July 2004 (week ending) for 6 weeks.
 Up All Night re-entered the top 10 at number 5 on 18 September 2004 (week ending) for 3 weeks, at number 5 on 30 April 2005 (week ending) for 2 weeks and at number 9 on 16 July 2005 (week ending) for 2 weeks.
 The Stone Roses originally peaked outside the top 10 at number 82 upon its initial release in 1994. The album's previous highest placing was two weeks at number 23 when it was re-released in 1998.
 Original Pirate Material originally peaked outside the top 10 at number 12 upon its initial release in 2002.
 Room on the 3rd Floor re-entered the top 10 at number 10 on 28 August 2004 (week ending).
 O re-entered the top 10 at number 10 on 14 August 2004 (week ending) for 2 weeks and at number 8 on 29 January 2005 (week ending) for 2 weeks.
 Greatest Hits (Robbie Williams album) re-entered the top 10 at number 5 on 7 January 2006 (week ending) for 2 weeks.
 Il Divo re-entered the top 10 at number 6 on 5 March 2005 (week ending) for 2 weeks.
 Love Songs: A Compilation... Old and New re-entered the top 10 at number 9 on 19 February 2005 (week ending) and at number 10 on 12 March 2005 (week ending).
 ...Allow Us to Be Frank re-entered the top 10 at number 9 on 25 December 2004 (week ending) for 2 weeks.
 How to Dismantle an Atomic Bomb re-entered the top 10 at number 10 on 22 January 2005 (week ending) and at number 10 on 26 February 2005 (week ending).
 Mind Body & Soul re-entered the top 10 at number 9 on 26 February 2005 (week ending).
 American Idiot re-entered the top 10 at number-one on 8 January 2005 (week ending) for 9 weeks, at number 9 on 2 April 2005 (week ending), and at number 7 on 30 July 2005 (week ending) for 2 weeks.
 Kasabian re-entered the top 10 at number 4 on 22 January 2005 (week ending) for 3 weeks.
 Hot Fuss re-entered the top 10 at number 5 on 8 January 2005 (week ending) for 9 weeks, at number 10 on 19 March 2005 (week ending), at number 10 on 2 April 2005 (week ending) for 2 weeks and at number 10 on 23 July 2005 (week ending).
 Figure includes album that peaked in 2003.
 Figure includes album that first charted in 2003 but peaked in 2004.
 Figure includes album that peaked in 2005.

See also
2004 in British music
List of number-one albums from the 2000s (UK)

References
General

Specific

External links
2004 album chart archive at the Official Charts Company (click on relevant week)

United Kingdom top 10 albums
Top 10 albums
2004